Ura is a town in Ura Gewog in Bumthang District in northeastern Bhutan.

Matsutake Festival
The town is famous for the Matsutake Festival that is organized every August. The festival celebrates the mushroom season.

References

External links

Satellite map at Maplandia.com

Populated places in Bhutan